Ralco Hydroelectric Plant  is a hydroelectric power station and dam in Bío Bío Region, Chile. The plant uses water from the upper Bío Bío River and produces  of electricity. The plant was built by ENDESA in 2004. The project has proven controversial with local indigenous Mapuche since a graveyard had to be flooded by the dam.

References

Energy infrastructure completed in 2004
Energy infrastructure in Biobío Region
Hydroelectric power stations in Chile
Dam controversies
Dams in Chile
Mapuche conflict